This article describes the qualification for the 2020 European Men's Handball Championship.

Qualification system
Teams competed for 20 places at the final tournament in two distinct Qualification Phases. In each phase, the teams were divided into several pots according to their positions in the EHF National Team Ranking.

Qualification Phase 1

Seeding
The draw for the qualification round was held on 24 June 2016 in Vienna, Austria. The group winners advance to the Phase 2.

Groups

Group 1
The tournament was played in a tournament format.

Group 2

Group 3

IHF Emerging Nations Championship

The three best placed European teams of this tournament qualified to the Phase 2.

Note: China finished in sixth place but is not a European nation.

Qualification Phase 2
Twenty-six pre-qualified teams joined the six qualified teams from previous rounds. Those 32 teams were split into eight groups, with the winners and runner-ups qualifying for the final tournament, as well as the four best third-placed teams.
The draw for the qualification round was held on 12 April 2018 in Trondheim, Norway.

As Bosnia and Herzegovina, the Netherlands and Portugal had the same points in the national team ranking, an extra draw was held just before the actual draw in which the two first teams drawn were placed in pot 2, while the third went into pot 3 Netherlands and Portugal were drawn to be in pot 2. Furthermore, for political reasons, Serbia and Kosovo could not be drawn into the same group.

Group 1

Group 2

Group 3

Group 4

Group 5

Group 6

Group 7

Group 8

Ranking of third-placed teams
The four highest ranked third-placed teams from the groups directly qualify for the tournament. Matches against the fourth placed teams in each group will be discarded.

Ranking of fourth-placed teams
The three lowest ranked fourth-placed teams not selected as hosts of 2022 European Men's Handball Championship will play in its Relegation round.

References

External links
Official website

Qualification
European Men's Championship qualification
European Men's Championship qualification
European Men's Championship qualification
Qualification for handball competitions